Ersi Sotiropoulou is a Greek writer. She was born in Patras and now lives in Athens. She has published more than a dozen books of fiction and poetry. Her work has been translated into many languages, and has won numerous domestic and international awards. Noted books include Zigzag through the Bitter Orange Trees (English translation by Peter Green), which was the first novel to win both the Greek national prize for literature and Greece's leading book critics' award. What’s Left of the Night (translated by Karen Emmerich) won the 2017 Prix Méditerranée Étranger in France. Emmerich has also translated her short story collection Landscape with Dog.

Novels (selected) 
 Zigk-zagk stis nerantziés (1999) 
 Damázontas to ktínos (2003) 
 Éva (2009) 
 Ti ménei apó ti nýchta (2015); Prix Méditerranée Étranger 2017
 Boreís (2017, «Μπορείς»)

References

Greek writers
Year of birth missing (living people)
Living people